The Sparrows may refer to:

 The Sparrows (Military Unit), the 79th Light Anti-Aircraft Battery, a Royal Artillery unit active during World War II
 The Sparrows (band), a Canadian 1960s blues rock band
 The Sparrows: a Study of the Genus Passer, a 1988 book by J. Denis Summers-Smith

See also
 Sparrow (disambiguation)